Badaber, alternatively spelt Badhber  is a village in Peshawar District, Khyber Pakhtunkhwa, Pakistan.

Overview 
Badaber currently hosts a refugee camp and formerly was the location of a military prison, established in February 1980. The prison was the site of the Badaber Uprising during the Soviet–Afghan War in 1985, in which captured Soviet and Afghan POWs staged an unsuccessful armed revolt against American CIA- and Pakistani ISI-backed Afghan mujahideen forces in an attempt to escape. Neighbouring villages include: Sheikh Mohammadi, Darra, Bazi Khel, and Kaga Wala. The village is inhabited by various Pashtun tribes, most notably the Momand, Hoorizai and Khalil.

Significance 
Badaber is most famously known for hosting a former United States Air Force–Central Intelligence Agency facility, which was established in 1958 and administered by the American National Security Agency during the Cold War. It was from here that the 1960 Gary Powers U-2 mission was coordinated and launched with the purpose of spying on the Soviet Union. During the peak of its Western Bloc operations, there were over 1000 American personnel stationed here. Today, the facility (PAF Camp Badaber) serves as a non-flying base for the Pakistan Air Force.

Administrative Area 
Badaber is part of Pakistan National Assembly seat NA-4 (Peshawar-4); some parts of Badaber come under PF-10 (Peshawar-10) and PF-11 (Peshawar-11) within the Khyber Pakhtunkhwa Provincial Assembly.

Educational Facilities 
The village is home to the Government Degree College Badaber Peshawar.

See also 
 Peshawar
 Peshawar District
Pakistan–United States relations
Pakistan–United States military relations

References

Populated places in Peshawar District
Peshawar District